Lake Mackay is a salt lake in Australia.

Lake Mackay  may also refer to.

Lake Mackay hare-wallaby, an extinct Australian animal species 
Lake Mackay, Northern Territory, a locality in Australia

See also
MacKay Lake (Northwest Territories)
Mackay (disambiguation)